Mansourah District is a district of Bordj Bou Arréridj Province, Algeria.

Municipalities
The district is further divided into 5 municipalities:
Mansoura
Ben Daoud 
El M'hir
Haraza
Ouled Sidi Brahim

Districts of Bordj Bou Arréridj Province